Carrollton High School is a public high school in Carrollton, Ohio.  It is the only high school in the Carrollton Exempted Village School District.  Carrollton HS is in the central part of Carroll County, Ohio.  It is located near Bell-Herron Middle School and is connected to Carrollton Elementary School.  The athletic teams are named the Warriors and are members of the Eastern Buckeye Conference,

Notes and references

External links
 District Website

High schools in Carroll County, Ohio
Public high schools in Ohio